Moulton is a civil parish in Cheshire West and Chester, England. It contains three buildings that are recorded in the National Heritage List for England as designated listed buildings, all of which are at Grade II.  This grade is the lowest of the three gradings given to listed buildings and is applied to "buildings of national importance and special interest". The listed buildings all date from the 19th and 20th centuries.

See also
Listed buildings in Bostock
Listed buildings in Davenham
Listed buildings in Whitegate and Marton
Listed buildings in Winsford

References
Citations

Sources

Listed buildings in Cheshire West and Chester
Lists of listed buildings in Cheshire